Jharpokharia (also known as Bombay Chacck locally) is a small town in Mayurbhanj district of the Indian state of Odisha and located at the junction of National Highway 6 and National Highway 16. It is 30 km from Baripada, the district headquarters of the Mayurbhanj district, and is home to the Seemanta Institute of Pharmaceutical Sciences, Seemanta Engineering College, and Seemanta Mahavidyalaya.

Geography

References

Cities and towns in Mayurbhanj district